The Eternal Golden Castle, alternatively but less well known as Erkunshen Battery, is a defensive castle in Anping District, Tainan, Taiwan.

History
The castle was built in 1874 and completed on 1876 by the famous Qing official Shen Baozhen in order to safeguard the coast and to defend the island against Japanese invasions.  This military facility saw its first action in the Sino-French war of 1884.  When Taiwan was ceded to the Empire of Japan by the Qing in 1895, the Taiwanese people fought under the Republic of Formosa banner against the invading Japanese battleships from this fortress.  Under Japanese control this military facility lost its value.  Its value is completely lost when during the Russo-Japanese War the imperial Japanese government sold some of the fort's cannons.

Features
There is a park near the castle grounds where people can enjoy picnics, as well as rental paddle boats for people to sail around the castle. There are occasional music performances in the evening, and actors sometimes fire the last remaining artillery gun in the castle to give visitors a fully immersive experience.

Transportation
By driving: Take the Yongkang Interchange (Exit 319) of Freeway 1 and head in a south-westerly direction.

By public transport: Take the TRA to Tainan Station, and then take buses 2, 7, 12, and 20 to Ximen bus stop. Then take bus 15 to Miaoshouli, and you should be there in a few minutes.

Ticket prices
There is a NT$50 (US$1.68) fare for each visitor.

See also
 List of tourist attractions in Taiwan
 Ershawan Battery
 Fort Zeelandia
 Fort Provintia
 History of Taiwan

References

Bibliography

Bender, Andrew et al. (2004). Taiwan. San Francisco: Lonely Planet.

1874 establishments in Taiwan
Forts in Tainan
Taiwan under Qing rule
Taiwan under Japanese rule
Castles in Taiwan
National monuments of Taiwan

19th-century fortifications